Dejan Tiago-Stanković (2 November 1965 – 20 December 2022) was a Serbian-Portuguese writer and literary translator. As a literary translator, he made the first translations of José Saramago in Serbian as well as of Ivo Andrić in Portuguese.

In 2017, Tiago-Stanković signed the Declaration on the Common Language of the Croats, Serbs, Bosniaks and Montenegrins.

Tiago-Stanković died at his home in Lisbon on the evening of 20 December 2022, and his body was found on the next day. He was 57 years old.

Literary works

English 
 Estoril, a war novel (Head of Zeus, London 2017)
 Tales of Lisbon (Prime Books, Estoril)

Portuguese 
 Estoril, romance de guerra (Bookbuilders, Lisboa 2016.)
 Contos de Lisboa (Prime Books, Estoril)
 Lisboa ultrassecreta (Globo, São Paulo)

Serbian 
 Zamalek, roman o kismetu. (Zamalek, Belgrade 2020) 
 Estoril, ratni roman (Geopoetika, Belgrade 2015)
 Odakle sam bila više nisam i druge lisabonske priče (Geopoetika, Belgrade 2012)

Literary prizes 
 Winner of Branko Ćopić Prize by Serbian Academy of Sciences and Arts for the novel Estoril.
 Longlisted for International Dublin Literary Award 2017.
 Winner of HWA Crowns Literary Award by The Historical Writers’ Association, 2018.
 Winner of European Union Prize for Literature

References 

1965 births
2022 deaths
20th-century Serbian writers
21st-century Serbian writers
Signatories of the Declaration on the Common Language
Writers from Belgrade
Serbian emigrants to Portugal